Coreus marginatus is a herbivorous species of true bug in the family Coreidae. It is commonly known as the dock bug as it feeds on the leaves and seeds of docks and sorrels. It is a medium-sized speckled brown insect, between 13 and 15 mm long as an adult, with a broad abdomen. It occurs throughout Europe, Asia and northern Africa. It is often found in dense vegetation, such as hedgerows and wasteland.

Taxonomy
This species was among the first Hemiptera formally described in the scientific literature by the Swedish biologist Carl Linnaeus in 1758, under the name Cimex marginatus. It was transferred to the genus Coreus by the Danish zoologist Johan Fabricius in 1794. It has numerous synonyms and was historically placed in the genus Syromastus.

The specific epithet marginatus refers to the prominent margins of the abdomen.

Description
The head, pronotum and abdomen of an adult dock bug are speckled reddish brown. The antennae are composed of four segments, red-orange in colour except for the final fourth segment which is black. Between the antennae are two small projections, known as antenniferous tubercles, which can be used to distinguish this species from other superficially similar species. The pronotum has angular upward facing projections and the scutellum is clearly visible. The rounded edge of the abdomen has lighter coloured markings.

  Young nymphs look different in appearance to the adults. They are heavily spined, less uniform in colouration and have disproportionately large antennae compared to their body size. Older nymphs looks more similar to adults with a more uniform speckled brown colouration but lacking developed wings.

Like other Coreidae, Coreus marginatus has scent glands with small pores in the middle of its thorax which can release strong-smelling, irritating, volatile defensive chemicals when disturbed. The pores have an ultrastructure composed of mushroom-like structures that are connected to each other via ridges and trabecules. The chemical composition of the scent gland secretions is similar between males and females, although the relative proportions are different. In females the most prevalent chemical compound is hexanoic acid while in males it is stearic acid.

Distribution
Linnaeus originally described the species from Europe with only one of his specimens having a specific locality of England. Other early specimens collected by Goeze are from France  The current distribution is extensive and covers: Europe, from Portugal to Finland; Asia, from Russia to China; and Africa, known only from Algeria.

Life cycle

Like other Coreidae the dock bug has an annual life cycle consisting of an egg followed by five successive nymphal instars before becoming an adult.  It overwinters as an adult and copulates in the typical heteropteran back-to-back position, laying large brown eggs between late May and early July. The eggs take around 3 to 4 weeks to hatch. The young nymphs will feed on leaves and stems while the older nymphs, like the adults, feed on seeds. The nymphs mature to adults from August onwards.

Diet
The dock bug is herbivorous and feeds on a wide variety of plants from different families. While the common name in English refers to its preferred diet of docks and sorrels and other  plants in the family Polygonaceae, they also readily feed on certain species of Asteraceae and Rosaceae. Adults are known to feed on raspberry, gooseberry and sometimes blackcurrant.

Gallery

References

Coreini
Bugs described in 1758
Hemiptera of Europe
Taxa named by Carl Linnaeus